Shanghai Airlines Cargo (上海航空股份公司) was a cargo airline based in Shanghai the People's Republic of China. A joint venture between Shanghai Airlines and EVA Air of the Evergreen Group based in Taiwan, Republic of China, it was established in June 2006. The airline was merged into China Cargo Airlines, along with Great Wall Airlines.

Destinations 

Shanghai Airlines Cargo served the following destinations:

Mainland China
Shanghai (Shanghai Pudong International Airport) Hub
Hong Kong
Hong Kong International Airport
Japan
Osaka (Kansai International Airport)
Singapore
Singapore (Changi Airport)
South Korea
Seoul (Incheon International Airport)
Thailand
Bangkok (Suvarnabhumi Airport)
United States
Anchorage (Ted Stevens Anchorage International Airport)
Chicago (O'Hare International Airport)
Los Angeles (Los Angeles International Airport)

Fleet 

Shanghai Airlines Cargo operated the following aircraft:
2 Boeing 757-200F
3 McDonnell Douglas MD-11F
Boeing 737-300F

External links

Official website

Defunct airlines of China
Airlines established in 2006
Economy of Shanghai
Airlines disestablished in 2011